Spodnja Bela is a settlement in the Municipality of Preddvor in the Upper Carniola region of Slovenia.

References

External links
Spodnja Bela at Geopedia.si

Populated places in the Municipality of Preddvor